Naw Zipporah Sein is a Karen political activist and former Vice-President of the Karen National Union. Zipporah Sein was born in 1955 in Kayin State, Burma, and trained as a teacher before fleeing to Thailand in 1995. From 1998 to 2008, she was the coordinator and executive secretary of the Karen Women's Organization, which describes its mission as helping Karen women refugees. She has been called a "heroine" by the Political Heroes website.

References

External links
Biography on the Asian-Eurasian Human Rights Forum
Zipparh Sein's Facebook Page
Karen Women's Organization
1000 Peace-women: Naw Zipporah Sein.

Burmese activists
Living people
Burmese people of Karen descent
Burmese rebels
Women in war
1955 births
People from Kayin State